Apatophysis kashmiriana is a species of beetle in the family Cerambycidae, in the subgenus Protapatophysis.

References

Dorcasominae